Auguste Jean François Grenier (22 September 1814, in Andelys – 13 July 1890, in Bagnères) was a French doctor and entomologist. He studied at Rouen, then at Paris where he qualified as a doctor in 1842. He was devoted to entomology only between 1857 and 1859. The war of 1870 put an end to his research.

Grenier was especially interested in cavernicolous Coleoptera and made a large collection including the cave insect collections of Charles Nicholas Aubé (1802–1869) and of Jules Linder (1830–1869). His collection is preserved by the Société entomologique de France. He was president of that society in 1865.

Sources
Jean Lhoste (1987). Les Entomologistes français 1750–1950. INRA Éditions: 351 p.
Translated from French Wikipedia

French entomologists
Presidents of the Société entomologique de France
1814 births
1890 deaths